Exasperation Inlet  is a large ice-filled inlet,  wide at its entrance between Foyn Point and Cape Disappointment, on the east coast of Graham Land. It was charted in 1947 by the Falkland Islands Dependencies Survey, who so named it because the disturbed nature of the ice in the vicinity caused considerable difficulty to sledging parties.

References

Further reading 
 Defense Mapping Agency  1992, Sailing Directions (planning Guide) and (enroute) for Antarctica, P 276

External links 
 Exasperation Inlet on USGS website
 Exasperation Inlet on SCAR website
 Exasperation Inlet on marineregions.org
 Updated long term weather forecast for Exasperation Inlet 

Inlets of Graham Land
Oscar II Coast